Thespesia is a genus of 13 flowering shrubs and trees in the Hibiscus family, Malvaceae, although within the family they are more closely related to cotton plants (Gossypium). The genus is distributed from the South Pacific through Asia, Africa, and the Caribbean.

Selected species

Thespesia beatensis (Urb.) Fryxell (Beata Island, Dominican Republic)
Thespesia acutiloba (Baker f.) Exell & Mendonça
Thespesia cubensis (Britton & P.Wilson) J.B.Hutch. (Cuba)
Thespesia danis Oliv. (eastern Africa)
Thespesia fissicalyx Borss.Waalk.
Thespesia garckeana F.Hoffm. (Southern Africa)
Thespesia grandiflora DC. - Maga (Puerto Rico)
Thespesia gummiflua Capuron
Thespesia mossambicensis Exell & Hillcoat (Mozambique)
Thespesia multibracteata Borss.Waalk.
Thespesia patellifera Borss.Waalk.
Thespesia populnea (L.) Sol. ex Corrêa - Portia tree (Pantropical)
Thespesia populneoides (Roxb.) Kostel.

References

External links

 Thespesia populnea at Australian native hibiscus and hibiscus like species.

 
Malvaceae genera